Cheyanne Nicolae Vlismas (born June 25, 1995) is an American mixed martial artist who competes in the Strawweight division of the Ultimate Fighting Championship.

Background

Vlismas began training in karate when she was three years old and then transitioned to taekwondo when she was ten years old, later obtaining a black belt in the sport. She got into MMA at the age of fifteen. When she was seventeen, she got expelled from high school for fighting and her family decided to let her start training full time. She took her first amateur fight four days after her eighteenth birthday.

She is the ex-wife of fellow UFC fighter, JP Buys.

Mixed martial arts career

Early career
Cheyanne made her MMA debut at LFA 35, where she faced Karla Hernandez and went on to defeat her via TKO in the third round, securing her first victory under the banner of Legacy Fighting Alliance in the process. Vlismas faced Helen Peralta at Invicta FC 29: Kaufman vs. Lehner, losing her bout via unanimous decision.  Then at EFC 74, Vlismas defeated Karolina Wojcik via split decision, before she went on to defeat Canadian Lindsey Garbatt at BTC 6 Night of Champions via unanimous decision.

In her second appearance with Legacy Fighting Alliance at LFA 78, Vlismas faced Rebecca Adney and defeated her via unanimous decision.

Vlismas was invited to Dana White's Contender Series 30 on August 25, 2020 and faced Hilarie Rose. She won the bout via unanimous decision, getting a UFC contract in the process.

Ultimate Fighting Championship
Vlismas was scheduled to face Kay Hansen on March 20, 2021 at UFC on ESPN: Brunson vs. Holland. However, Hansen pulled out due to undisclosed reasons and was replaced on March 12 by promotional newcomer Montserrat Ruiz. She lost the bout via unanimous decision, getting kept in a headlock position for most of the bout.

Vlismas faced Gloria de Paula on July 31, 2021 at UFC on ESPN: Hall vs. Strickland. She won the bout in the first round after head kicking de Paula after she was getting up and finished her with ground and pound. This fight earned her the Performance of the Night award.

Vlismas was scheduled to face Loma Lookboonmee on November 20, 2021 at UFC Fight Night 198. However, Vlismas withdrew from the bout for undisclosed reasons and she was replaced by Lupita Godinez.

Vlismas faced Mallory Martin, replacing Montserrat Ruiz, on December 4, 2021 at UFC on ESPN 31. Vlismas won the fight via unanimous decision. This fight earned her the Fight of the Night award.

Vlismas was scheduled to face Tabatha Ricci on October 1, 2022 at UFC Fight Night 211. Vlismas pulled out in late August due to personal reasons and was replaced by former UFC Women's Strawweight Championship challenger and inaugural Invicta FC Atomweight Champion Jessica Penne.

Vlismas faced Cory McKenna on December 17, 2022 at UFC Fight Night 216. She lost the fight via unanimous decision.

Championships and accomplishments
 Ultimate Fighting Championship
 Performance of the Night (One time) 
 Fight of the Night (One time) 
BTC Fight Promotions
 Interim BTC Strawweight Championship (One time)

Mixed martial arts record

|-
|Loss
|align=center|7–3
|Cory McKenna
|Decision (unanimous)
|UFC Fight Night: Cannonier vs. Strickland
| 
|align=center|3
|align=center|5:00
|Las Vegas, Nevada, United States
|
|-
|Win
|align=center|7–2
|Mallory Martin
|Decision (unanimous)
|UFC on ESPN: Font vs. Aldo 
|
|align=center|3
|align=center|5:00
|Las Vegas, Nevada, United States
|
|-
| Win
| align=center| 6–2
| Gloria de Paula
| TKO (head kick and punches)
| UFC on ESPN: Hall vs. Strickland
| 
| align=center| 1
| align=center| 1:00
| Las Vegas, Nevada, United States
| 
|-
|Loss
|align=center|5–2
|Montserrat Ruiz
|Decision (unanimous)
|UFC on ESPN: Brunson vs. Holland
|
|align=center|3
|align=center|5:00
|Las Vegas, Nevada, United States
|
|-
|Win
|align=center|5–1
|Hilarie Rose
|Decision (unanimous)
|Dana White's Contender Series 30
|
|align=center|3
|align=center|5:00
|Las Vegas, Nevada, United States
|
|-
| Win
| align=center| 4–1
|Rebecca Adney
| Decision (unanimous)
|LFA 78
| 
| align=center| 3
| align=center| 5:00
| Belton, Texas, United States
| 
|-
|Win
|align=center|3–1
|Lindsay Garbatt
|Decision (unanimous)
|BTC 6: Night of Champions
|
|align=center|3
|align=center|5:00
|Burlington, Ontario, Canada
|
|-
|Win
|align=center|2–1
|Karolina Wójcik
|Decision (split)
|EFC Worldwide 74
|
|align=center|3
|align=center|5:00
|Johannesburg, South Africa
|
|-
|Loss
|align=center|1–1
|Helen Peralta
|Decision (unanimous)
|Invicta FC 29: Kaufman vs. Lehner
|
|align=center|3
|align=center|5:00
|Kansas City, Missouri, United States
|
|-
|Win
|align=center|1–0
|Karla Hernandez
|TKO (elbows)
|LFA 35
|
|align=center|3
|align=center|4:22
|Houston, Texas, United States
|

See also 
 List of current UFC fighters
 List of female mixed martial artists

References

External links 
  
 

1995 births
Living people
American female taekwondo practitioners
V
Strawweight mixed martial artists
Mixed martial artists utilizing taekwondo
Ultimate Fighting Championship female fighters
21st-century American women
Sportspeople from St. Petersburg, Florida
Mixed martial artists from Florida